AI YoungBoy is the seventh mixtape by American rapper YoungBoy Never Broke Again. It was released on August 4, 2017, by Never Broke Again, distributed by Atlantic Records, serving as his first commercial release with Atlantic. The mixtape features guest appearances from Peewee Longway and Yo Gotti. The mixtape also features production from Dubba-AA, DJ Swift, CashMoneyAP, DJ Shawdi P and Nard & B, among others. The mixtape peaked at number 24 on the US Billboard 200, making YoungBoy's first entry on the chart.

The mixtape was supported by two singles: "Untouchable" and "No Smoke".

A sequel was released on October 11, 2019.

Promotion

Singles 
The lead single from the mixtape, "Untouchable", was released on May 30, 2017, with the accompanied music video. The song was produced by D. Brooks Exclusive.

The second single and final single from the mixtape, "No Smoke", was released on August 3, 2017, with the accompanied music video, before the mixtape was released. The song was produced by DJ Chose.

Music videos 
The music video, "Graffiti", was released on July 28, 2017.

The music video, "Wat Chu Gone Do" featuring American rapper Peewee Longway, was released on August 18, 2017.

Critical reception

AI YoungBoy received positive reviews from music critics. Writing for Pitchfork, Sheldon Pearce noted that "the teenage rapper from Baton Rouge is quiet outside his raps, which teem with pent-up aggression and anxiety," because of this, he continued that "many songs read like journal entries." Continuing his review, Pearce states that YoungBoy "spills his guts in a grisly drawl still coated in a nasally boyish rasp, constantly negotiating the terms of innocence and indecency." Pearce concludes his review by writing that "AI YoungBoy he evolves as a writer and rapper, and he begins to realize his versatility."

Commercial performance 
AI YoungBoy debuted at 24 on the US Billboard 200, which became YoungBoy's first entry on the chart. The mixtape also debuted at number 17 on the US Top R&B/Hip-Hop Albums and at number 12 on the US Top Rap Albums charts, which was also YoungBoy's first entry on both charts as well. On August 4, 2020, the album was certified platinum by the Recording Industry Association of America (RIAA) for combined sales and album-equivalent units of over a million units in the United States.

Track listing 
Track listing and credits were adapted from Spotify and Genius.

Charts

Certifications

References 

Atlantic Records albums
2017 mixtape albums
Trap music albums
Southern hip hop albums
YoungBoy Never Broke Again albums